Yoshiaki Ishizawa (born 1937, Obihiro, Hokkaido) is a Japanese academic and a professor at Sophia University. He is a recipient of Ramon Magsaysay Award 2017 for "restoration of Angkor Wat since the time of civil war nurturing human resources and specialists of Cambodia to conserve the heritage site resulting Cambodian people to regain the pride for their own cultural heritage".

References

Academic staff of Sophia University
1937 births
Living people